The flows of Jordan Craters volcanic field are the youngest of a series of large Quaternary basalt fields in the eastern part of the U.S. state of Oregon. The field is thought to be approximately 3200 years old, based on findings of a lake sediment coring experiment in 1986. It was formed by basaltic pahoehoe emanating from vents throughout the area.

The most recent flows come from Coffeepot Crater, a large breached cinder cone. These flows show excellent examples of inflated lava. Historically, it is believed that Coffeepot Crater held a pond of lava that would occasionally breach the sides of the crater to flow freely into the field.

Jordan Craters is approximately 120 miles (200 km) southwest of Boise, Idaho and 18 miles (30 km) northwest of Jordan Valley, Oregon.

The craters are free and open to the public all year.

See also 
 List of volcanoes in the United States of America

References 
(archived)

Volcanic fields of Oregon
Landforms of Malheur County, Oregon